Emily Black is a British environmental scientist. As of June 2022, she is Professor of Meteorology at the University of Reading and a senior research fellow in National Centre for Atmospheric Science (Climate).

Background and scientific career 
Black completed an MA in Natural Sciences at Gonville and Caius College, University of Cambridge in 1996 and PhD at Wolfson College, University of Oxford in 1999. She moved to the National Centre for Atmospheric Science (Climate) at the University of Reading in 2000 and was promoted to Professor in 2018. Black leads the Tropical Applications of Meteorology using Satellite data (TAMSAT) programme which provides early warning of rainfall excess and deficit for the whole of Africa.

Research interests 
Black's research focusses on the variability in the hydrological cycle and its associated hazards, particularly relating to human impacts. She is an expert in land-atmosphere interactions and their impact on climate. Black also advises policy and response to changing rainfall, primarily through the TAMSAT programme.

Awards and honours 
2021 Times Higher Education (THE) Awards Research Project of the Year (STEM) for work on TAMSAT

2020 The Royal Meteorological Society Hugh Robert Mill Award, which recognises original research related to rainfall.

2016 Appointed Associate Editor for Royal Meteorological Journal, Atmospheric Science Letters

References 

British meteorologists
Living people
20th-century births
Year of birth missing (living people)
Academics of the University of Reading
Alumni of Gonville and Caius College, Cambridge
Alumni of Wolfson College, Oxford
Women meteorologists